Wang Weidong (born 22 January 1982 in Baisha, Hainan) is a male Chinese sports sailor who competed for Team China at the 2008 Summer Olympics. He also participated in the 2012 Summer Olympics.

Major performances
1997/2005 National Games - 3rd OP class/1st 470 class;
2006/2007/2008 National Champions Tournament - 1st 470 class;
2006 Asian Championships - 2nd 470 class;
2006 Asian Games - 6th 470 class;
2007 National Water Sports Games - 1st 470 class

References

 http://2008teamchina.olympic.cn/index.php/personview/personsen/837

1982 births
Living people
Chinese male sailors (sport)
Olympic sailors of China
Sportspeople from Hainan
Sailors at the 2008 Summer Olympics – 470
Sailors at the 2012 Summer Olympics – 470
Asian Games medalists in sailing
Sailors at the 2010 Asian Games
Sailors at the 2006 Asian Games
People from Baisha County
Medalists at the 2010 Asian Games
Asian Games silver medalists for China
21st-century Chinese people